Mike Piscitelli is a director, photographer  and actor.

Filmography

Music videos
Banks - Drowning 
Bonnie 'Prince' Billy & Matt Sweeney - I Gave You
Iggy Pop - Little know it all 
J. Cole – Power Trip (featuring Miguel) 
John Frusciante - The past recedes
Poliça – Tiff (featuring Justin Vernon)
Van She - Jamaica 
The Bronx - History's Stranglers
The Bronx - False Alarm
The Bronx - They will kill us all
Something Corporate - Space

Short films
Waiting For Tomorrow To Wake Up (2013) 
Tomate, A short film for The Elder Statesman (2014)

Film
God Bless Ozzy Osbourne (2011)

References

American music video directors
Film directors from California
Living people
Male actors from Los Angeles
Photographers from California
Year of birth missing (living people)